Reliance Steel and Aluminum Co. (RSAC), headquartered in Scottsdale, Arizona, is the largest metals service center operator in North America. The company provides metals processing services and distributes a line of approximately 100,000 metal products, including aluminum, brass, alloy, copper, carbon steel, stainless steel, titanium, and specialty metal products to 125,000 customers such as fabricators and manufacturers.

The company is ranked 275th on the Fortune 500.

The company operates under more than 40 brands including Phoenix Metals, Allegheny Steel Distributors, Best Manufacturing, CCC Steel, Delta Steel, EMJ, Feralloy, Infra-Metals Co., KMS Fab LLC and KMS South, Liebovich, Metals USA,
National Specialty Alloys, Pacific Metal, Reliance Metalcenter, Siskin Steel, Tube Service, Valex, and Yarde Metals.

History
The company was founded in Los Angeles on February 3, 1939 by Thomas J. Neilan. Originally named Reliance Steel Products Company, the business made and sold steel reinforcing bars (rebar) for the construction industry. In 1944, the name was shortened to Reliance Steel Company.

On September 14, 1994, the company became a public company via an initial public offering.

Acquisitions

References

External links
 
 

Aluminum companies of the United States
Companies based in St. Johns, Portland, Oregon
Companies listed on the New York Stock Exchange
Metal companies of the United States
Manufacturing companies based in Los Angeles
Manufacturing companies established in 1939
Steel companies of the United States
1939 establishments in California
1994 initial public offerings